The Pureshi-class (プレシ) locomotives were a group of steam tank locomotives with 2-6-2 wheel arrangement of used by the Chosen Government Railway (Sentetsu) in Korea. The "Pure" name came from the American naming system for steam locomotives, under which locomotives with 2-6-2 wheel arrangement were called "Prairie".

In all, Sentetsu owned 227 locomotives of all Pure classes, whilst privately owned railways owned another 52; of these 279 locomotives, 169 went to the Korean National Railroad in South Korea and 110 to the Korean State Railway in North Korea.

Description
The Pureshi class consisted of 46 Purei-class locomotives rebuilt by Sentetsu's Gyeongseong Works from 1925. Major modifications included increasing the size of the firebox to allow the use of lignite, which has a lower caloric value than anthracite coal. Boiler volume was increased, the heat transfer area was increased, the stoker was enlarged, and special attention was given to the prevention of sparks. The performance was found to be good, and eventually 46 Purei class locomotives were rebuilt to Pureshi standard. The redesign work also gave Sentetsu engineers important experience, which was later applied to the design of the Pashishi and Mikasa-class locomotives. After Sentetsu's general renumbering of 1938 they were numbered プレシ1 through プレシ46.

The original identities of the locomotives rebuilt is unknown.

Postwar
After the Liberation and partition of Korea, the Pureshi-class locomotives were divided between North and South, but the specifics of which engine went where are unclear; those going to the Korean National Railroad in the South would be designated 푸러4 (Pureo4) class, those with the Korean State Railway in the North would be designated 부러너 (Purŏnŏ) class.

References

Locomotives of Korea
Locomotives of North Korea
Locomotives of South Korea
Railway locomotives introduced in 1925
2-6-2 locomotives
Baldwin locomotives
Gyeongseong Works locomotives
Rebuilt locomotives